The 2008 United States presidential election in Montana took place on November 4, 2008, and was part of the 2008 United States presidential election. Voters chose three representatives, or electors to the Electoral College, who voted for president and vice president.

Montana was won by Republican nominee John McCain by 11,273 votes, a 2.38% margin of victory. Before the election, Montana was initially viewed as safe Republican, but was viewed as lean Republican or toss-up in the final weeks. Historically the state is a Republican stronghold, but polls during the 2008 election showed Democrat Barack Obama just narrowly trailing Republican John McCain within the margin of error. On election day, McCain narrowly carried Montana. It was the fourth-closest state in the nation, behind Missouri, North Carolina, and Indiana, Missouri being a former bellwether state, and the other three being traditionally Republican states. As of 2022, this is the last time Montana voted to the left of Arizona, as well as the most recent time in which Montana was considered at least somewhat competitive. This marks the first time since 1944 in which Montana would back a different candidate than Colorado.

Despite the fact that Bill Clinton carried the state in 1992, Barack Obama's 47.11% of the vote was (and as of 2022 remains) the highest percent of the vote received by any Democratic candidate for President since 1964. Bill Clinton's victory in 1992 and near miss in 1996 were attributed to Ross Perot's strong third party candidacy in 1992 and 1996, the only other elections since 1964 when Montana was decided by under 5%. Obama was able to flip seven of Montana's counties from Republican to Democratic compared to the 2004 election.

Primaries
 2008 Montana Democratic presidential primary
 2008 Montana Republican presidential caucuses and primary

Campaign

Predictions
There were 15 news organizations who made state-by-state predictions of the election. Here are their last predictions before election day:

Polling

Although Republican George W. Bush of Texas carried the Treasure State by double digits in both 2000 and 2004, polls taken throughout July indicated a close race between Republican John McCain of Arizona and Democrat Barack Obama of Illinois. When Governor Sarah Palin of Alaska was announced as McCain's running mate in late August, however, McCain took a double-digit lead in the state that lasted until the middle of October, when polling once again showed the two candidates within striking distance of each other in the state. When the actual 2008 presidential election took place, McCain carried the state by about 2.38%. The state's results were significantly closer than they were in the 2004 election when George W. Bush carried the state by a margin of 20 points.

Fundraising
John McCain raised a total of $386,940 in the state. Barack Obama raised $1,089,874.

Advertising and visits
Obama and his interest groups spent $1,732,467. McCain and his interest groups spent just $134,805. The Democratic ticket visited the state three times and McCain didn't visit the state.

Analysis
Montana, a Republican-leaning state, has voted for the Republican presidential nominee in every election since 1968 except in 1992 when the state narrowly supported Democrat Bill Clinton to Republican George H. W. Bush.

Obama did very well among the Democratic base of Montana, which consists of three sections. Students in Missoula County, which is home to the University of Montana, helped him win a three-to-two margin there. In the southwest, Obama won more than 65% of the vote in Deer Lodge County and Silver Bow County—Democratic strongholds which have voted Republican only twice since 1912; Obama also became the first Democratic presidential nominee to win Gallatin County, home to Bozeman, since Franklin D. Roosevelt in 1944. Finally, Native Americans gave Obama strong support; in the eastern part of the state, Obama only won counties in which Native Americans composed at least 30% of the population.

McCain's base was in the eastern part of the state, which is less unionized and more rural. It is home to more ranchers and fewer miners than elsewhere. Only five counties voted Democratic in the east. In Western Montana, McCain generally won wherever Obama's Democratic base was lacking. His biggest margins came from the region bordering the GOP bastion of Idaho.

There was also a relatively high third-party vote, totaling around four percent. The Montana Constitution Party ran libertarian-leaning Republican U.S. Representative Ron Paul of Texas on their line (against his wishes), winning  2.17% of the vote in Montana, which was the highest statewide percentage total for any third-party candidate in the 2008 presidential election. A significant number of write-in candidates also ran in the state, with some beating third-party candidates.

During the same election, incumbent Democratic Governor Brian Schweitzer was reelected to a second term in a landslide over Republican Roy Brown and Libertarian Stan Jones. Winning by more than a two-to-one margin, Schweitzer received 65.21% of the vote while Brown took in 32.77% and Jones got 2.03%. Also during the same election, incumbent Democratic Senator Max Baucus was handily reelected to a sixth term over perennial candidate Bob Kelleher running as a Republican, no third-party candidate was in the race. Due to Kelleher's policies, such as adopting a parliamentary system in the United States, adopting a single-payer healthcare system, and nationalizing American oil and gas industries, he received no support from Montana GOP, and Baucus defeated Kelleher by nearly a 3-to-1 margin, taking in 72.92% over Kelleher's 27.08% and winning every single county in the state. At the state level, however, Republicans picked up three seats in the Montana Senate and gained control of the chamber. Democrats picked up the office of Secretary of State.

, this is the last election where Montana was seriously contested, as well as the last one in which Lake County, Cascade County, Rosebud County, and Lewis and Clark County voted for the Democratic candidate. This is the last time the Big Sky Country would be decided by a single-digit margin, and the last time a candidate won the state with less than half of the vote. Obama became the first ever Democrat to win the White House without carrying Mineral or Sheridan Counties, as well as the first to do so without carrying Dawson County since Jimmy Carter in 1976.

Results

By county

Counties that flipped from Republican to Democratic
 Blaine (largest city: Chinooko)
 Cascade (largest city: Great Falls)
 Gallatin (largest city: Bozeman)
 Hill (largest city: Havre)
 Lake (largest city: Polson)
 Lewis and Clark (largest city: Helena)
 Rosebud (largest city: Colstrip)

By congressional district
Due to the state's low population, only one congressional district is allocated, the At-Large District. This district covers the entire state, and thus is equivalent to the statewide election results.

Electors

Technically the voters of Montana cast their ballots for electors: representatives to the Electoral College. Montana is allocated 3 electors because it has 1 congressional district and 2 senators. All candidates who appear on the ballot or qualify to receive write-in votes must submit a list of 3 electors, who pledge to vote for their candidate and his or her running mate. Whoever wins the majority of votes in the state is awarded all 3 electoral votes. Their chosen electors then vote for president and vice president. Although electors are pledged to their candidate and running mate, they are not obligated to vote for them. An elector who votes for someone other than his or her candidate is known as a faithless elector.

The electors of each state and the District of Columbia met on December 15, 2008, to cast their votes for president and vice president. The Electoral College itself never meets as one body. Instead the electors from each state and the District of Columbia met in their respective capitols.

The following were the members of the Electoral College from the state. All 3 were pledged to John McCain and Sarah Palin:
Thelma Baker
John Brenden
Errol Galt

See also
 United States presidential elections in Montana
 Presidency of Barack Obama

References

Montana
2008
2008 Montana elections